Saint Peregrine may refer to:

People

 Peregrinus, Bishop of Terni, †138
 Peregrine of Auxerre, † ca. 261 or 304
 San Pellegrino in Vaticano
 Peregrine Laziosi, 1260–1345, an Italian saint of the Servite Order

Other

 San Pellegrino (disambiguation)